William Dodgin (17 April 1909 – 16 October 1999) was an English professional footballer who played as a left half and later served as a manager, coach and scout.

Football career
Dodgin played in the Football League, most notably for Clapton Orient and Lincoln City and after retiring, he turned to management with Southampton, Fulham, Brentford and Sampdoria. Dodgin later served former club Bristol Rovers as a coach, scout and manager. His final job in football was as chief scout at Eastville and he retired from football in 1981.

Personal life 
Dodgin's son Bill was also a footballer and played under his father's management at Southampton and Fulham. Prior to turning professional with Huddersfield Town in 1928, he worked as a miner. During the Second World War he worked at an aircraft factory in Hamble-le-Rice and played football for their works team Folland Aircraft. While manager of Yiewsley, he ran a tobacconists and sweet shop in Byfleet.

Honours 
 Bell's Merit Award

Career statistics

References

External links

1909 births
1999 deaths
Footballers from Gateshead
English footballers
Association football wing halves
Wallsend F.C. players
Kirkley & Pakefield F.C. players
Lowestoft Town F.C. players
Huddersfield Town A.F.C. players
Lincoln City F.C. players
Charlton Athletic F.C. players
Bristol Rovers F.C. players
Leyton Orient F.C. players
Southampton F.C. players
Folland Sports F.C. players
English football managers
Southampton F.C. managers
Fulham F.C. managers
Brentford F.C. managers
Bristol Rovers F.C. managers
U.C. Sampdoria managers
English Football League managers
Expatriate football managers in Italy
Brentford F.C. wartime guest players
English expatriates in Italy
Serie A managers
Bristol Rovers F.C. non-playing staff
Hillingdon Borough F.C. managers
Chelsea F.C. wartime guest players